Sarcoxie Township is an inactive township in Jasper County, in the U.S. state of Missouri.

Sarcoxie Township takes its name from the community of Sarcoxie, Missouri.

References

Townships in Missouri
Townships in Jasper County, Missouri